Joseph & Mary is a 2016 Canadian biblical drama film directed by Roger Christian and starring Kevin Sorbo as Joseph. It portrays the birth and early life of Jesus under the rule of King Herod the Great of the Roman Empire in the 1st century and includes an allegory about forgiveness involving the rabbi Elijah, a fictional character invented for the film.

Plot 
When King Herod the Great's tax collectors kill Aaron for being unable to pay, his friend Elijah the rabbi swears to protect Aaron's wife Rebekah and their children. Joseph and Mary travel to Bethlehem for the census and while they are there Mary gives birth to Jesus in a stable. The Three Magi visit Herod in search of the child and Herod sends them to Bethlehem, where the prophecies foresee the birth taking place, and tells them to report the child's location back to him. The magi find Joseph, Mary, and Jesus in the stable but do not return to Herod, instead traveling further east.

In accordance with Jewish law, Joseph and Mary present their child and two doves to Simeon and Anna the Prophetess at the Temple in Jerusalem and then return to Nazareth. Herod calls for the rabbis to be brought to him but they do not tell him where the prophesied child is. In retaliation, Herod calls for the slaughter of all male children under two years of age. Joseph and Mary flee to Egypt as the children are slaughtered, including Rebekah's newborn child. Tiberius is wounded and receives a scar on his cheek as he kills Rebekah's older son and father as well. Elijah is distraught and Rebekah vows to avenge their death and seek retribution from the Roman soldier Tiberius.

Years later, Joseph, Mary, Elijah and Rebekah have returned to Nazareth. Tiberius, the new publican, visits and is recognized by Rebekah. She urges Elijah to kill Tiberius but Elijah questions his desire for retribution when Joseph and his twelve-year-old son Jesus recommend forgiveness instead. When Tiberius recognizes and attacks Rebekah, she claws his face and he drops his sword. Elijah grabs the sword and throws it off a cliff and Tiberius falls to his death chasing it.

As Joseph is dying, he has a vision that his young son is chasing after him. He tells the vision of Jesus to leave Nazareth with Mary and then he has a vision of the crucifixion of his adult son. He is then visited by Mary before dying.

Cast

 Kevin Sorbo as Joseph
 Lara Jean Chorostecki as Mary
 Steven McCarthy as Rabbi Elijah
 Lucius Hoyos as Jesus @ 12
 Joseph Mesiano as Jesus @ 30
 Lawrence Bayne as King Herod
 Ashley Armstrong as Leper
 Josh Bainbridge as Aaron
 Morgan Bedard as Angry Merchant
 Sean Bell as Tiberius
 Katie Boland as Rebekah
 Rod Carley as Magi #1
 Jim Calarco as Magi #2
 Lewis Hodgson as Defiant Villager
 Greg Janveau as Villager
 Daniel Kash as High Priest
 Paula Kaye as Walla Group Performer
 Ron Kennell as Surly Merchant
 Géza Kovács as Simeon
 Steven Love as King Antipas
 Stephen Eric McIntyre as Nathan
 Drew Moss as Innkeeper
 Joe Ring as Innkeeper #2
 Andrew Muir as Merchant
 Cassie Owoc as Nazarene Woman
 Michael James Regan as King Herod's Attendant
 Chris Renaud as Roman soldier
 John Tench as Surly Publican
 Deborah Tennant as Anna
 Michael Therriault as Elder Rabbi
 Anthony Ulc as Seth

Production
Filming took place in North Bay, Ontario, Canada, in October and November 2015.

Release
The film was released on home video in the United States on July 5, 2016, and in Canada on November 2, 2016. The home video contains optional captions as well as an optional descriptive audio in English for the visually impaired.

Reception
Richard Smith of The Christian Film Review gave the film a positive review of 6.5/10, describing it as an "inspiring film with a message of hope, love and mercy."

Renee Schonfeld of Common Sense Media gave the film a negative review of 1/5 stars, writing that the film "doesn't flinch from using brutality as a means to tell the tale" and concluding that it is "not recommended for younger kids."

See also
List of Christmas films

References

External links

2016 films
2010s English-language films
Films directed by Roger Christian
Canadian drama films
English-language Canadian films
Films based on the New Testament
Films set in Jerusalem
Portrayals of Jesus in film
Films about the Nativity of Jesus
Portrayals of the Virgin Mary in film
Portrayals of Saint Joseph in film
2016 drama films
Films shot in North Bay, Ontario
2010s Canadian films